{{Infobox television
| image                = SunTrap (TV series).png
| image_size           = 260
| image_alt            =
| caption              = 
| alt_name             = Woody 
| genre                = Sitcom
| creator              = Neil WebsterCharlie Skelton
| based_on             = 
| developer            = 
| writer               = Neil WebsterCharlie Skelton
| screenplay           = 
| story                = 
| director             = 
| creative_director    = 
| starring             = Kayvan NovakBradley WalshEmma PiersonJamie Demetriou
| theme_music_composer = 
| opentheme            = "Stone Cold Sober"by Paloma Faith
| endtheme             = 
| composer             = Todd Kinnon (uncredited)
| country              = United Kingdom
| language             = English
| num_series           = 1
| num_episodes         = 6
| list_episodes        = 
| executive_producer   = 
| producer             = 
| editor               = 
| location             = Gran Canaria
| cinematography       = 
| camera               = 
| runtime              = 30 minutes
| company              = Happy Tramp Productions
| distributor          = 
| budget               = 
| channel              = BBC One
| picture_format       = 16:9 1080i
| audio_format         = Stereo
| first_aired          = 
| last_aired           = 
| preceded_by          = 
| followed_by          = 
| related              =  
}}SunTrap'' is a British television sitcom produced by Happy Tramp Productions for the BBC. The series was created and written by Neil Webster and Charlie Skelton. The storyline follows Woody (Kayvan Novak), an undercover journalist who is a master of disguises but forced to go on the run after an undercover plot is foiled by his corrupt editor. He escapes to a Spanish island where his former mentor Brutus (Bradley Walsh) is now living and running a bar. Initially not pleased to see his protégé, Brutus realises that by letting Woody solve investigations, using a variety of disguises, he can make a profit.

The series was filmed entirely in Gran Canaria with El Faro bar in Puerto de Mogan standing in for Brutus' bar. For the first series six episodes were produced to air on BBC One and the initial one was broadcast on 27 May 2015. The show was not renewed for a second series following negative reviews.

Episode list

Regular cast

Kayvan Novak as Woody
Bradley Walsh as Brutus
Emma Pierson as Melody
Jamie Demetriou as Zorro
Diana Payan as Lorenza
Keith Allen as Señor Big
Alan Williams as Donald
Bea Segura as Captain Carmelita
Bill Holland as Sergeant Juan

References

External links
 
 
 

2015 British television series debuts
2015 British television series endings
2010s British sitcoms
BBC high definition shows
BBC television sitcoms
English-language television shows
Television shows set in Spain